Gymnastics events have been staged at the Olympic Games since 1896. Australian female gymnasts have participated in every Summer Olympics since 1956. A total of 48 female gymnasts have represented Australia. Australian women have not won any medals at the Olympics. Lisa Skinner is the only Australian female gymnast who has competed in at least three Olympics.

Gymnasts

References

Olympic
Australia
Artistic gymnasts